Triple M Sunraysia (official callsign: 3RMR) is a commercial radio station owned and operated by Southern Cross Austereo as part of the Triple M network. The station is broadcast to the Sunraysia region located on the Victoria–New South Wales border from studios in Mildura.

The station commenced broadcasting in 1933 as 3MA, initially on the AM band at a frequency of 1360 kilohertz, before converting to the FM band as Sun FM on 20 November 1997. On 15 December 2016, the station was relaunched as Triple M.

Programming
Local programming is produced and broadcast from the station's Mildura studios from 6am–12pm weekdays. The station's local output consists of a three-hour breakfast show presented by Matt Jonsen, and a three-hour mornings show presented by Silco.

Networked programming originates from studios in Townsville, the Gold Coast, Melbourne and Sydney.

References

External links

Mainstream rock radio stations in Australia
Radio stations established in 1933
Radio stations in Victoria
Mildura
1933 establishments in Australia